The La Grande-2-A is a hydroelectric power station on the La Grande River that is part of Hydro-Québec's James Bay Project. The station can generate 2,106 MW and was commissioned in 1991–1992. Together with the adjacent Robert-Bourassa generating station, it uses the reservoir and dam system of the Robert-Bourassa Reservoir to generate electricity.

See also 

 List of largest power stations in Canada
 Reservoirs and dams in Canada

External links 
 Hydro-Québec's La Grande Complex
 La Grande System
 La Grande-2-A

James Bay Project
Dams in Quebec
Dams completed in 1992
Dams on the La Grande River
Publicly owned dams in Canada